The 1951 Pittsburgh Pirates season was the 70th season of the Pittsburgh Pirates franchise; the 65th in the National League. The Pirates finished seventh in the league standings with a record of 64–90.

Offseason 
 November 16, 1950: Catfish Metkovich was drafted by the Pirates from the Oakland Oaks in the 1950 rule 5 draft.

Regular season

Season standings

Record vs. opponents

Game log

|- bgcolor="ccffcc"
| 1 || April 16 || @ Reds || 4–3 || Chambers (1–0) || Blackwell || Werle (1) || 30,441 || 1–0
|- bgcolor="ccffcc"
| 2 || April 17 || Cardinals || 5–4 || Dickson (1–0) || Poholsky || Werle (2) || 25,894 || 2–0
|- bgcolor="ffbbbb"
| 3 || April 21 || @ Reds || 3–8 || Fox || Chambers (1–1) || — || 4,180 || 2–1
|- bgcolor="ccffcc"
| 4 || April 22 || @ Reds || 7–5 || Werle (1–0) || Blackwell || — || 7,254 || 3–1
|- bgcolor="ffbbbb"
| 5 || April 23 || @ Cubs || 1–2 || Hiller || Queen (0–1) || — || 7,899 || 3–2
|- bgcolor="ccffcc"
| 6 || April 24 || @ Cubs || 6–4 || Law (1–0) || Lown || Werle (3) || 7,750 || 4–2
|- bgcolor="ffbbbb"
| 7 || April 25 || @ Cardinals || 0–4 || Poholsky || Chambers (1–2) || — || 9,628 || 4–3
|- bgcolor="ffbbbb"
| 8 || April 27 || Reds || 5–7 || Blackwell || Muir (0–1) || Fox || 27,135 || 4–4
|- bgcolor="ffbbbb"
| 9 || April 28 || Reds || 2–4 || Wehmeier || Dempsey (0–1) || Smith || 10,657 || 4–5
|- bgcolor="ccffcc"
| 10 || April 29 || Reds || 9–8 (13) || Dickson (2–0) || Smith || — ||  || 5–5
|- bgcolor="ffffff"
| 11 || April 29 || Reds || 1–1 (10) ||  ||  || — || 23,601 || 5–5
|-

|- bgcolor="ccffcc"
| 12 || May 1 || @ Dodgers || 6–2 || Chambers (2–2) || Palica || — || 6,716 || 6–5
|- bgcolor="ccffcc"
| 13 || May 2 || @ Dodgers || 4–3 || Dickson (3–0) || Newcombe || — || 6,238 || 7–5
|- bgcolor="ccffcc"
| 14 || May 3 || @ Giants || 7–4 (10) || Queen (1–1) || Jones || Werle (4) || 9,649 || 8–5
|- bgcolor="ffbbbb"
| 15 || May 4 || @ Giants || 1–5 || Maglie || Dempsey (0–2) || — || 3,947 || 8–6
|- bgcolor="ffbbbb"
| 16 || May 5 || @ Giants || 3–8 || Bowman || Koski (0–1) || — || 10,265 || 8–7
|- bgcolor="ffbbbb"
| 17 || May 6 || @ Braves || 0–6 || Spahn || Dickson (3–1) || — ||  || 8–8
|- bgcolor="ccffcc"
| 18 || May 6 || @ Braves || 3–0 || Chambers (3–2) || Estock || — || 15,492 || 9–8
|- bgcolor="ccffcc"
| 19 || May 8 || @ Phillies || 9–3 || Queen (2–1) || Heintzelman || Werle (5) || 13,700 || 10–8
|- bgcolor="ffbbbb"
| 20 || May 9 || @ Phillies || 5–6 (10) || Konstanty || Muir (0–2) || — || 14,134 || 10–9
|- bgcolor="ccffcc"
| 21 || May 10 || @ Phillies || 2–0 || Dickson (4–1) || Church || — || 3,562 || 11–9
|- bgcolor="ffbbbb"
| 22 || May 11 || Cubs || 4–10 || Rush || Chambers (3–3) || — || 22,760 || 11–10
|- bgcolor="ffbbbb"
| 23 || May 12 || Cubs || 4–8 || Hiller || Law (1–1) || Minner || 7,528 || 11–11
|- bgcolor="ccffcc"
| 24 || May 13 || Cubs || 2–1 || Queen (3–1) || Schultz || — ||  || 12–11
|- bgcolor="ffbbbb"
| 25 || May 13 || Cubs || 0–6 || Klippstein || Dickson (4–2) || — || 25,434 || 12–12
|- bgcolor="ccffcc"
| 26 || May 15 || Giants || 7–3 || Werle (2–0) || Spencer || Law (1) || 25,838 || 13–12
|- bgcolor="ffbbbb"
| 27 || May 16 || Giants || 1–2 || Hearn || Walsh (0–1) || — || 24,103 || 13–13
|- bgcolor="ccffcc"
| 28 || May 17 || Giants || 12–7 || Dickson (5–2) || Kennedy || — || 13,926 || 14–13
|- bgcolor="ffbbbb"
| 29 || May 18 || Braves || 3–12 || Surkont || Queen (3–2) || — || 30,890 || 14–14
|- bgcolor="ffbbbb"
| 30 || May 19 || Braves || 2–6 || Bickford || Law (1–2) || — || 13,217 || 14–15
|- bgcolor="ffbbbb"
| 31 || May 20 || Phillies || 0–17 || Meyer || Dickson (5–3) || — ||  || 14–16
|- bgcolor="ffbbbb"
| 32 || May 20 || Phillies || 4–12 || Roberts || Dusak (0–1) || — || 36,166 || 14–17
|- bgcolor="ffbbbb"
| 33 || May 22 || Dodgers || 8–17 || Erskine || Friend (0–1) || Branca || 22,360 || 14–18
|- bgcolor="ffbbbb"
| 34 || May 23 || Dodgers || 4–11 || Newcombe || Queen (3–3) || — || 15,759 || 14–19
|- bgcolor="ccffcc"
| 35 || May 25 || @ Cubs || 10–1 || Dickson (6–3) || Hiller || — || 8,143 || 15–19
|- bgcolor="ffbbbb"
| 36 || May 26 || @ Cubs || 4–5 (10) || Schmitz || Walsh (0–2) || — || 9,006 || 15–20
|- bgcolor="ffbbbb"
| 37 || May 28 || @ Cardinals || 5–6 (10) || Poholsky || LaPalme (0–1) || — || 9,757 || 15–21
|- bgcolor="ffbbbb"
| 38 || May 30 || @ Cardinals || 3–4 || Presko || Dickson (6–4) || Wilks ||  || 15–22
|- bgcolor="ffbbbb"
| 39 || May 30 || @ Cardinals || 3–7 || Munger || Queen (3–4) || — || 26,952 || 15–23
|-

|- bgcolor="ffbbbb"
| 40 || June 1 || @ Giants || 2–8 || Maglie || Chambers (3–4) || — || 16,875 || 15–24
|- bgcolor="ffbbbb"
| 41 || June 2 || @ Giants || 3–14 || Hearn || LaPalme (0–2) || — || 7,003 || 15–25
|- bgcolor="ffbbbb"
| 42 || June 3 || @ Phillies || 2–11 || Roberts || Queen (3–5) || — ||  || 15–26
|- bgcolor="ffbbbb"
| 43 || June 3 || @ Phillies || 3–8 || Church || Dickson (6–5) || — || 19,325 || 15–27
|- bgcolor="ccffcc"
| 44 || June 4 || @ Phillies || 12–4 || Friend (1–1) || Meyer || Dickson (1) || 2,343 || 16–27
|- bgcolor="ccffcc"
| 45 || June 5 || @ Braves || 8–0 || LaPalme (1–2) || Sain || — || 4,302 || 17–27
|- bgcolor="ffbbbb"
| 46 || June 6 || @ Braves || 2–5 || Spahn || Chambers (3–5) || — || 5,030 || 17–28
|- bgcolor="ffbbbb"
| 47 || June 7 || @ Braves || 0–5 || Bickford || Queen (3–6) || — || 4,916 || 17–29
|- bgcolor="ccffcc"
| 48 || June 9 || @ Dodgers || 4–1 || Dickson (7–5) || Newcombe || — || 11,462 || 18–29
|- bgcolor="ffbbbb"
| 49 || June 10 || @ Dodgers || 1–2 || Branca || Friend (1–2) || — ||  || 18–30
|- bgcolor="ccffcc"
| 50 || June 10 || @ Dodgers || 5–4 (11) || Werle (3–0) || Erskine || — || 24,602 || 19–30
|- bgcolor="ffbbbb"
| 51 || June 12 || Braves || 3–13 || Sain || Chambers (3–6) || — || 16,054 || 19–31
|- bgcolor="ccffcc"
| 52 || June 14 || Braves || 9–4 || Dickson (8–5) || Bickford || — || 4,277 || 20–31
|- bgcolor="ffbbbb"
| 53 || June 15 || Giants || 6–11 || Hearn || Friend (1–3) || — || 22,746 || 20–32
|- bgcolor="ffbbbb"
| 54 || June 16 || Giants || 1–6 || Maglie || LaPalme (1–3) || — || 8,673 || 20–33
|- bgcolor="ccffcc"
| 55 || June 17 || Giants || 11–5 || Pollet (1–0) || Bowman || Werle (6) ||  || 21–33
|- bgcolor="ffbbbb"
| 56 || June 17 || Giants || 6–7 (10) || Jansen || Dickson (8–6) || — || 25,090 || 21–34
|- bgcolor="ffbbbb"
| 57 || June 19 || Phillies || 2–9 || Meyer || Dickson (8–7) || — || 16,601 || 21–35
|- bgcolor="ffbbbb"
| 58 || June 20 || Phillies || 0–1 || Church || Friend (1–4) || — || 12,751 || 21–36
|- bgcolor="ffbbbb"
| 59 || June 21 || Phillies || 5–10 || Roberts || LaPalme (1–4) || — || 5,682 || 21–37
|- bgcolor="ffbbbb"
| 60 || June 22 || Dodgers || 4–8 || King || Wilks (0–1) || — || 24,966 || 21–38
|- bgcolor="ffbbbb"
| 61 || June 23 || Dodgers || 1–13 || Newcombe || Werle (3–1) || — || 9,937 || 21–39
|- bgcolor="ccffcc"
| 62 || June 24 || Dodgers || 10–7 || Dickson (9–7) || Erskine || — ||  || 22–39
|- bgcolor="ccffcc"
| 63 || June 24 || Dodgers || 5–4 || Wilks (1–1) || King || — || 31,435 || 23–39
|- bgcolor="ccffcc"
| 64 || June 26 || @ Reds || 3–2 || Pollet (2–0) || Perkowski || — || 8,313 || 24–39
|- bgcolor="ffbbbb"
| 65 || June 27 || @ Reds || 1–2 || Ramsdell || Friend (1–5) || — || 5,788 || 24–40
|- bgcolor="ccffcc"
| 66 || June 28 || @ Reds || 7–5 || Werle (4–1) || Raffensberger || Wilks (2) || 7,568 || 25–40
|- bgcolor="ffbbbb"
| 67 || June 30 || @ Cardinals || 4–8 || Chambers || Dickson (9–8) || — || 13,479 || 25–41
|-

|- bgcolor="ffbbbb"
| 68 || July 1 || @ Cardinals || 4–5 (12) || Staley || Pollet (2–1) || — || 21,195 || 25–42
|- bgcolor="ccffcc"
| 69 || July 2 || Cubs || 7–2 || Dickson (10–8) || Hiller || — || 12,661 || 26–42
|- bgcolor="ccffcc"
| 70 || July 3 || Cubs || 2–0 || Law (2–2) || Rush || — || 4,650 || 27–42
|- bgcolor="ccffcc"
| 71 || July 4 || Reds || 4–1 || Friend (2–5) || Blackwell || Wilks (3) ||  || 28–42
|- bgcolor="ccffcc"
| 72 || July 4 || Reds || 16–4 (6) || Werle (5–1) || Ramsdell || — || 16,061 || 29–42
|- bgcolor="ffbbbb"
| 73 || July 5 || Reds || 0–4 || Fox || Pollet (2–2) || — || 2,212 || 29–43
|- bgcolor="ffbbbb"
| 74 || July 6 || Cardinals || 2–3 || Munger || Dickson (10–9) || — || 24,532 || 29–44
|- bgcolor="ccffcc"
| 75 || July 7 || Cardinals || 5–1 || Law (3–2) || Lanier || — || 10,127 || 30–44
|- bgcolor="ccffcc"
| 76 || July 8 || Cardinals || 6–2 || Friend (3–5) || Staley || Wilks (4) ||  || 31–44
|- bgcolor="ffbbbb"
| 77 || July 8 || Cardinals || 8–9 || Chambers || Wilks (1–2) || Staley || 31,085 || 31–45
|- bgcolor="ffbbbb"
| 78 || July 12 || @ Phillies || 6–11 || Meyer || Dickson (10–10) || — || 10,618 || 31–46
|- bgcolor="ffbbbb"
| 79 || July 13 || @ Phillies || 2–3 || Roberts || Pollet (2–3) || — || 7,786 || 31–47
|- bgcolor="ffbbbb"
| 80 || July 14 || @ Phillies || 0–2 || Church || Law (3–3) || — || 4,106 || 31–48
|- bgcolor="ccffcc"
| 81 || July 15 || @ Giants || 7–6 (12) || Dickson (11–10) || Koslo || — ||  || 32–48
|- bgcolor="ffbbbb"
| 82 || July 15 || @ Giants || 3–8 || Hearn || Werle (5–2) || — || 17,945 || 32–49
|- bgcolor="ffbbbb"
| 83 || July 16 || @ Giants || 6–7 || Spencer || Werle (5–3) || — || 3,390 || 32–50
|- bgcolor="ccffcc"
| 84 || July 17 || @ Dodgers || 4–3 || Pollet (3–3) || Podbielan || Wilks (5) || 18,097 || 33–50
|- bgcolor="ccffcc"
| 85 || July 18 || @ Dodgers || 13–12 || Walsh (1–2) || Palica || Wilks (6) || 7,083 || 34–50
|- bgcolor="ffbbbb"
| 86 || July 20 || @ Braves || 6–11 || Spahn || Law (3–4) || — || 5,767 || 34–51
|- bgcolor="ffbbbb"
| 87 || July 21 || @ Braves || 6–11 || Bickford || Law (3–5) || — || 3,263 || 34–52
|- bgcolor="ffbbbb"
| 88 || July 22 || @ Braves || 3–5 || Chipman || Wilks (1–3) || — ||  || 34–53
|- bgcolor="ccffcc"
| 89 || July 22 || @ Braves || 5–2 || Dickson (12–10) || Wilson || — || 8,514 || 35–53
|- bgcolor="ffbbbb"
| 90 || July 23 || Braves || 14–15 || Paine || Law (3–6) || Chipman || 8,112 || 35–54
|- bgcolor="ffbbbb"
| 91 || July 24 || Giants || 3–4 (10) || Maglie || Friend (3–6) || — || 17,858 || 35–55
|- bgcolor="ccffcc"
| 92 || July 25 || Giants || 5–4 || Wilks (2–3) || Spencer || — || 8,718 || 36–55
|- bgcolor="ccffcc"
| 93 || July 27 || Braves || 8–4 || Pollet (4–3) || Surkont || — || 17,256 || 37–55
|- bgcolor="ccffcc"
| 94 || July 28 || Braves || 8–4 || Dickson (13–10) || Spahn || — || 6,848 || 38–55
|- bgcolor="ccffcc"
| 95 || July 29 || Braves || 6–2 || Friend (4–6) || Sain || — ||  || 39–55
|- bgcolor="ffbbbb"
| 96 || July 29 || Braves || 4–5 || Wilson || Queen (3–7) || Estock || 17,881 || 39–56
|- bgcolor="ffbbbb"
| 97 || July 31 || Dodgers || 3–8 || Newcombe || Pollet (4–4) || — || 26,132 || 39–57
|-

|- bgcolor="ccffcc"
| 98 || August 1 || Dodgers || 12–9 || Werle (6–3) || King || Wilks (7) || 19,502 || 40–57
|- bgcolor="ffbbbb"
| 99 || August 2 || Dodgers || 5–10 || Erskine || Friend (4–7) || — || 10,986 || 40–58
|- bgcolor="ffbbbb"
| 100 || August 3 || Phillies || 4–5 || Roberts || Law (3–7) || — || 13,607 || 40–59
|- bgcolor="ccffcc"
| 101 || August 4 || Phillies || 7–3 || Dickson (14–10) || Johnson || — || 7,206 || 41–59
|- bgcolor="ffbbbb"
| 102 || August 5 || Phillies || 1–5 || Church || Friend (4–8) || — ||  || 41–60
|- bgcolor="ffbbbb"
| 103 || August 5 || Phillies || 7–12 || Heintzelman || Wilks (2–4) || Konstanty || 20,049 || 41–61
|- bgcolor="ffbbbb"
| 104 || August 7 || @ Cardinals || 7–16 || Boyer || LaPalme (1–5) || Brazle || 7,465 || 41–62
|- bgcolor="ccffcc"
| 105 || August 8 || @ Cardinals || 10–7 || Dickson (15–10) || Poholsky || Wilks (8) || 7,482 || 42–62
|- bgcolor="ffbbbb"
| 106 || August 9 || @ Cardinals || 0–4 || Chambers || Pollet (4–5) || — || 6,855 || 42–63
|- bgcolor="ccffcc"
| 107 || August 10 || @ Cubs || 3–0 || Queen (4–7) || McLish || — || 7,703 || 43–63
|- bgcolor="ffbbbb"
| 108 || August 11 || @ Cubs || 3–4 || Kelly || Law (3–8) || — ||  || 43–64
|- bgcolor="ccffcc"
| 109 || August 11 || @ Cubs || 2–1 || Friend (5–8) || Rush || — || 20,522 || 44–64
|- bgcolor="ccffcc"
| 110 || August 12 || @ Cubs || 1–0 || Dickson (16–10) || Hatten || — ||  || 45–64
|- bgcolor="ffbbbb"
| 111 || August 12 || @ Cubs || 0–6 || Minner || Werle (6–4) || — || 25,891 || 45–65
|- bgcolor="ffbbbb"
| 112 || August 13 || @ Reds || 0–2 || Fox || Pollet (4–6) || — ||  || 45–66
|- bgcolor="ffbbbb"
| 113 || August 13 || @ Reds || 1–7 || Blackwell || Walsh (1–3) || — || 9,992 || 45–67
|- bgcolor="ccffcc"
| 114 || August 15 || Cardinals || 7–0 || Friend (6–8) || Staley || — || 17,853 || 46–67
|- bgcolor="ffbbbb"
| 115 || August 16 || Cardinals || 6–9 || Staley || Dickson (16–11) || — || 6,619 || 46–68
|- bgcolor="ccffcc"
| 116 || August 17 || Cubs || 8–3 || Queen (5–7) || Minner || — || 10,007 || 47–68
|- bgcolor="ffbbbb"
| 117 || August 18 || Cubs || 5–11 || Kelly || Pollet (4–7) || Leonard || 6,212 || 47–69
|- bgcolor="ccffcc"
| 118 || August 19 || Cubs || 4–2 || Carlsen (1–0) || Hatten || — ||  || 48–69
|- bgcolor="ccffcc"
| 119 || August 19 || Cubs || 5–4 || Law (4–8) || Leonard || — || 16,434 || 49–69
|- bgcolor="ffbbbb"
| 120 || August 21 || @ Braves || 1–3 || Wilson || Friend (6–9) || — || 3,289 || 49–70
|- bgcolor="ffbbbb"
| 121 || August 22 || @ Braves || 4–5 (10) || Chipman || Werle (6–5) || — || 4,585 || 49–71
|- bgcolor="ccffcc"
| 122 || August 24 || @ Phillies || 5–1 || Dickson (17–11) || Thompson || — || 8,847 || 50–71
|- bgcolor="ccffcc"
| 123 || August 25 || @ Phillies || 3–2 (12) || Carlsen (2–0) || Konstanty || — || 5,276 || 51–71
|- bgcolor="ccffcc"
| 124 || August 26 || @ Dodgers || 12–11 || Law (5–8) || King || Dickson (2) ||  || 52–71
|- bgcolor="ffbbbb"
| 125 || August 26 || @ Dodgers || 3–4 (10) || Roe || Wilks (2–5) || — || 30,189 || 52–72
|- bgcolor="ffbbbb"
| 126 || August 27 || @ Dodgers || 0–5 || Branca || Queen (5–8) || — ||  || 52–73
|- bgcolor="ccffcc"
| 127 || August 27 || @ Dodgers || 5–2 || Werle (7–5) || Palica || Law (2) || 32,561 || 53–73
|- bgcolor="ccffcc"
| 128 || August 28 || @ Giants || 2–0 || Pollet (5–7) || Jones || — || 8,803 || 54–73
|- bgcolor="ffbbbb"
| 129 || August 29 || @ Giants || 1–3 || Hearn || Dickson (17–12) || — || 7,678 || 54–74
|- bgcolor="ccffcc"
| 130 || August 30 || @ Giants || 10–9 || Dickson (18–12) || Jansen || — || 8,230 || 55–74
|-

|- bgcolor="ffbbbb"
| 131 || September 1 || @ Cardinals || 2–6 || Chambers || Carlsen (2–1) || — || 11,637 || 55–75
|- bgcolor="ffbbbb"
| 132 || September 2 || @ Cardinals || 1–6 || Poholsky || Pollet (5–8) || — || 12,852 || 55–76
|- bgcolor="ffbbbb"
| 133 || September 3 || @ Cubs || 10–11 (12) || Dubiel || Law (5–9) || — ||  || 55–77
|- bgcolor="ccffcc"
| 134 || September 3 || @ Cubs || 4–3 (7) || Wilks (3–5) || Lown || — || 20,242 || 56–77
|- bgcolor="ffbbbb"
| 135 || September 5 || Reds || 3–6 || Wehmeier || Werle (7–6) || Raffensberger || 9,086 || 56–78
|- bgcolor="ccffcc"
| 136 || September 6 || Reds || 7–4 || Pollet (6–8) || Fox || Wilks (9) || 4,222 || 57–78
|- bgcolor="ffbbbb"
| 137 || September 7 || Cardinals || 4–11 || Bokelmann || Carlsen (2–2) || — || 7,371 || 57–79
|- bgcolor="ffbbbb"
| 138 || September 8 || Cardinals || 2–4 || Brazle || Queen (5–9) || — || 5,511 || 57–80
|- bgcolor="ffbbbb"
| 139 || September 9 || Cardinals || 1–2 (10) || Lanier || Dickson (18–13) || — ||  || 57–81
|- bgcolor="ffbbbb"
| 140 || September 9 || Cardinals || 4–7 || Bokelmann || Walsh (1–4) || — || 17,456 || 57–82
|- bgcolor="ffbbbb"
| 141 || September 11 || Phillies || 2–3 || Roberts || Carlsen (2–3) || — || 8,152 || 57–83
|- bgcolor="ccffcc"
| 142 || September 12 || Phillies || 8–6 || Law (6–9) || Hansen || Wilks (10) || 2,364 || 58–83
|- bgcolor="ffbbbb"
| 143 || September 14 || Dodgers || 1–3 || Roe || Dickson (18–14) || — || 18,050 || 58–84
|- bgcolor="ccffcc"
| 144 || September 15 || Dodgers || 11–4 || Queen (6–9) || Branca || Wilks (11) || 11,098 || 59–84
|- bgcolor="ffbbbb"
| 145 || September 16 || Giants || 1–7 || Jansen || Pollet (6–9) || — ||  || 59–85
|- bgcolor="ffbbbb"
| 146 || September 16 || Giants || 4–6 || Maglie || Dickson (18–15) || — || 24,990 || 59–86
|- bgcolor="ccffcc"
| 147 || September 18 || Braves || 6–5 || Yochim (1–0) || Wilson || Wilks (12) || 8,036 || 60–86
|- bgcolor="ccffcc"
| 148 || September 19 || Braves || 7–3 || Dickson (19–15) || Nichols || — || 2,793 || 61–86
|- bgcolor="ffbbbb"
| 149 || September 22 || @ Reds || 0–9 || Wehmeier || Friend (6–10) || — || 1,093 || 61–87
|- bgcolor="ccffcc"
| 150 || September 23 || @ Reds || 3–0 || Dickson (20–15) || Blackwell || — ||  || 62–87
|- bgcolor="ffbbbb"
| 151 || September 23 || @ Reds || 0–2 || Fox || Pollet (6–10) || — || 6,152 || 62–88
|- bgcolor="ccffcc"
| 152 || September 25 || Cubs || 6–3 || Queen (7–9) || Lown || Wilks (13) || 6,063 || 63–88
|- bgcolor="ffbbbb"
| 153 || September 28 || Reds || 3–4 || Wehmeier || Yochim (1–1) || — || 4,250 || 63–89
|- bgcolor="ffbbbb"
| 154 || September 29 || Reds || 2–4 || Blackwell || Dickson (20–16) || Smith || 13,843 || 63–90
|- bgcolor="ccffcc"
| 155 || September 30 || Reds || 8–4 (11) || Werle (8–6) || Smith || — || 9,068 || 64–90
|-

|-
| Legend:       = Win       = Loss       = TieBold = Pirates team member

Opening Day lineup

Notable transactions 
 June 15, 1951: Cliff Chambers and Wally Westlake were traded by the Pirates to the St. Louis Cardinals for Joe Garagiola, Dick Cole, Bill Howerton, Howie Pollet, and Ted Wilks.

Roster

Player stats

Batting

Starters by position 
Note: Pos = Position; G = Games played; AB = At bats; H = Hits; Avg. = Batting average; HR = Home runs; RBI = Runs batted in

Other batters 
Note: G = Games played; AB = At bats; H = Hits; Avg. = Batting average; HR = Home runs; RBI = Runs batted in

Pitching

Starting pitchers 
Note: G = Games pitched; IP = Innings pitched; W = Wins; L = Losses; ERA = Earned run average; SO = Strikeouts

Other pitchers 
Note: G = Games pitched; IP = Innings pitched; W = Wins; L = Losses; ERA = Earned run average; SO = Strikeouts

Relief pitchers 
Note: G = Games pitched; W = Wins; L = Losses; SV = Saves; ERA = Earned run average; SO = Strikeouts

Farm system

References

External links
 1951 Pittsburgh Pirates team page at Baseball Reference
 1951 Pittsburgh Pirates Page at Baseball Almanac

Pittsburgh Pirates seasons
Pittsburgh Pirates season
Pittsburg Pir